Karlee Delane Bispo (born January 14, 1990) is an American competition swimmer who specializes in middle-distance freestyle events.

At the 2013 World Aquatics Championships in Barcelona, Bispo won a gold medal in the 4x200-meter freestyle relay with her teammates Katie Ledecky, Shannon Vreeland, and Missy Franklin in a time of 7:45.14. Swimming the third leg, she recorded a split of 1:57.58.

References

External links
 
 
 Karlee Bispo – University of Texas athlete profile at TexasSports.com

1990 births
Living people
American female freestyle swimmers
Texas Longhorns women's swimmers
Sportspeople from Modesto, California
World Aquatics Championships medalists in swimming
Universiade medalists in swimming
Universiade gold medalists for the United States
Universiade bronze medalists for the United States
Medalists at the 2011 Summer Universiade